The Renault Austral is a compact crossover SUV (C-segment) manufactured and marketed by Renault. It was unveiled in March 2022 as a successor to the Kadjar, and built on the third-generation CMF-CD platform. It was publicly exhibited for the first time at the 2022 Paris Motor Show. Production began in July 2022 in Spain at the Palencia plant.

The "Austral" name was derived from the Latin word "australis", and has been trademarked since 2005.

Overview

The Austral carries the new retro-inspired logo, the LED lights are in Renault's C-Shape signature, while the cockpit is in the form of an entirely digital "L", in order to "surround the driver". A long LED strip joins the logo on either side of the tailgate. The Austral adopts Renault's new design, called Sensual Tech.

According to Agneta Dahlgren, Renault design project director, "the result is materialized by the combination of generous shapes, curved shoulders, projecting sides and the integration of subtle technical details such as high-tech headlamps. which reinforce its identity design”.

The dashboard of the Austral, called OpenR, is largely inspired by that of the Megane E-Tech Electric, but the layout is slightly revised.

Renault Espace
An extended-wheelbase version to replace the Espace will be unveiled on 28 March 2023 and is planned to go on sale from spring 2023, with prototypes spotted testing several times throughout 2022.

Safety
In autumn 2022, the Renault Austral was tested for automotive safety by Euro NCAP. It received five stars out of a possible five.

Powertrain

References

External links
 Official press release

Austral
Cars introduced in 2022
Compact sport utility vehicles
Crossover sport utility vehicles
Front-wheel-drive vehicles
Hybrid sport utility vehicles
Euro NCAP large MPVs
Partial zero-emissions vehicles
Vehicles with CVT transmission